Iniciativa Amotocodie is an environmental organization in Paraguay. The NGO has its seat in the town of Filadelfia. 
Iniciativa Amotocodie is part of the International Alliance for the Protection of Isolated Peoples and is on its Executive Committee. The members of its board are based in different parts, as well as other Latin American and European countries. Its aims include the cultural strengthening of the Ayoreo ethnic group. Benno Glauser is its director. On December 1, 2010 Paraguayan prosecutors and police broke into the premises of the NGO.
According to the organization, the forests of the Chaco are threatened by destruction. This is to a large extent by Germans and foreigners.

See also 
Survival International

References

External links
Website of the Organization (Spanish)
List of links to Publications (Spanish, English, German)

Nature conservation organizations based in South America
Human rights in Paraguay
Organisations based in Paraguay
Boquerón Department